The chapters of the manga series Kare Kano were written by Masami Tsuda. The first chapter premiered in the February 1996 issue of LaLa where it was serialized monthly until its conclusion in the June 2005 issue. The series follows the romance between "perfect" student Yukino Miyazawa and her academic rival Soichiro Arima, and the relationships of the various friends they make in high school while they struggle to learn to be true to themselves.

The 101 chapters, referred to as "Acts," were collected and published in 21 tankōbon volumes by Hakusensha starting on June 5, 1996; the last volume was released on August 5, 2005. The manga was adapted into a 26-episode anime series by Gainax that aired in Japan on TV Tokyo from October 2, 1998 to March 26, 1999. The manga series is licensed for regional language releases by Editions Tonkam in France by Grupo Editorial Vid in Mexico, by Glènat España in Spain, by Dynamic Italia in Italy, by Carlsen Comics in Germany, and by Planet Manga in Brazil. Its chapters were also serialized in the French magazine Magnolia and the German magazine Daisuki.

Kare Kano was initially licensed for an English-language release by Mixx Entertainment, but the company announced it lost the license in August 2000 before publication began. In July 2001, Tokyopop announced that it had acquired the license and that it would be serializing the title in their Smile magazine starting in 2002. Smile discontinued publication that same year. Tokyopop released the first tankōbon volume of the series on January 21, 2003; the final volume was released on January 10, 2007. It was one of the first manga series that Tokyopop released in the original Japanese orientation, in which the book is read from right to left, and with the original sound effects left in place. In February 2008, Tokyopop reissued the first three volumes in a single omnibus volume.

Volume list

See also
 List of Kare Kano characters

References

External links
 

Kare Kano